Saint Homobonus is the patron saint of business people, tailors, shoemakers, and clothworkers, as well as of Cremona, Italy.

He was canonized in 1199 at the urgent request of the citizens of Cremona.  He died on November 13, 1197 and his feast day is celebrated on November 13.

He was a merchant from Cremona, northern Italy.  Born Omobono Tucenghi, he was a married layman who believed that God had allowed him to work in order that he would be able to support people living in a state of poverty.  His name is derived from the Latin homo bonus ("good man").

Homobonus was able to pursue this calling in life easily as a result of the inheritance he received from his father, a prosperous tailor and merchant.  He practiced his business at Cremona with scrupulous honesty.  He also donated a large proportion of his profits to the relief of the poor.

Homobonus was a frequent church attendee that would partake in the Eucharist every day. While attending mass, prostrated in the form of a cross, on November 13, 1197, Homobonus died. Fourteen months later Homobonus was canonized by Pope Innocent III. In the bull of Homobonus's canonization Pope Innocent III called him "father of the poor", "consoler of the afflicted", "assiduous in constant prayer", "man of peace and peacemaker", "a man good in name and deed", "this saint, is still like a tree planted by streams of water that yields its fruit in our time."

The church of Sant'Omobono in Rome is dedicated to him.

Homobonus in popular culture
In recent years, statuettes of Saint Homobonus are being sold as novelty items or executive toys in the United States.  As the patron saint of business people, Homobonus has become a relevant figure in corporate culture.

In Italy a comune is named after him (Sant'Omobono Terme).
In Rome, there is a church named after him (Sant'Omobono).

Sources

External links
Catholic Forum: Homobonus
Vatican (Papal letter containing reference to Homobonus)
San Omobono 
 Sant' Omobono di Cremona

Medieval Italian saints
12th-century Christian saints
12th-century births
1197 deaths
Businesspeople from Cremona
Italian merchants